The 2007 NESTEA European Championship Final (or the 2007 European Beach Volleyball Championships,) was held from June 24 to June 26, 2007 in Valencia, Spain. It was the fifteenth official edition of the men's event, which started in 1993, while the women competed for the fourteenth time.

The Championships were part of the 2007 Nestea European Championship Tour.

The teams could earn qualifying points for the Beijing 2008 Olympics, from one of their two finishes at the 2007 or 2008 Championships.

Men's competition
 A total number of 24 participating couples

Women's competition
 A total number of 24 participating couples

References

 Beach Volleyball Results at the Beach Volleyball Database

2007
E
B
2007